Valerio Bertotto (born 15 January 1973) is an Italian football manager, who was most recently in charge of Serie B club Ascoli, and a former professional footballer, who played as a defender.

Club career 
Bertotto started his professional career during the 1990–91 season with Alessandria in the Italian Serie C2. He joined Udinese in 1993, quickly becoming a historical masterpiece for the team, and spending thirteen seasons with the Friuli side, also captaining his side to what is to date their only appearance in the UEFA Champions League, and also becoming the Udinese player with the highest number of matches ever played for the team.

In July 2006, aged 33, he left Udinese to join Siena, another Serie A team, playing two seasons as a regular for the Tuscan side. He was successively released as a free agent in June 2008, and in January 2009 he accepted an offer from Lega Pro Prima Divisione club Venezia. He was released for free after the club was excluded from the Italian football panorama due to financial issues.

In 2010, he obtained his UEFA A coaching license, which made him eligible to coach Lega Pro teams, however he had not yet started his coaching career at the time; he finally pursued a coaching career in 2012.

International career 
Bertotto has played 4 times for the Italy national football team between 2000 and 2001, all during his spell at Udinese, with his senior international debut coming in a World Cup qualifying match against Georgia on 11 October 2000, held in Ancona, under manager Giovanni Trapattoni. He missed out on the 2002 FIFA World Cup due to a knee injury.

Style of play 
Bertotto was a hard-tackling and uncompromising central or right-sided defender, who was solid in the air, and effective in the timing of his challenges. Although he was neither particularly quick nor technically gifted, he made up for his lack of pace and skill with his experience and positional sense, and his greatest strength was his ability to defend opposing forwards in one-on-one situations. He also stood out for his leadership throughout his career.

Managerial career

Italy U20 Lega Pro 
On 9 August 2012 he was named head coach of the Italy U20 Lega Pro in place of Giorgio Veneri.

Serie C years 
In April 2016 he took over the reins at Serie C club Pistoiese, guiding them to safety. He left in June 2016 to become the new head coach of Messina, which he however left already in August during the pre-season due to disagreements with the board.

In March 2017 he returned to management, accepting an offer from Serie C club Bassano Virtus, with whom he qualified to the promotion playoffs. He successively served as head coach of another Serie C club, Viterbese Castrense, between July and October 2017.

Ascoli 
On 25 August 2020, after three years of inactivity, he was named new head coach of Serie B club Ascoli, this being Bertotto's first coaching experience in the Italian second division.

He was dismissed on 29 November 2020 due to poor results, following a 1–2 league defeat to Venezia.

Personal life
On 4 November 2020 he tested positive for COVID-19.

Managerial statistics

Honours
Udinese
UEFA Intertoto Cup: 2000

References

External links 

1973 births
Living people
Footballers from Turin
Italian footballers
Italy international footballers
Association football defenders
U.S. Alessandria Calcio 1912 players
Udinese Calcio players
A.C.N. Siena 1904 players
Venezia F.C. players
Serie A players
Serie B players